Kuybyshevo may refer to:
Kuybyshevo, Russia, several rural localities in Russia
Kuybyshevo, an alternative name of Zhyngyldy, a town in Mangystau Region, Kazakhstan
Kuibysheve (Kuybyshevo), several inhabited localities in Ukraine